Old Friends from Young Years is the debut studio album by American rock band Papa Roach, self-produced and released on February 4, 1997. This album, along with their other independent demos, were released on the band's now defunct indie label, Onion Hardcore, so named because onion farming is a staple of Papa Roach's hometown, Vacaville, California. The album was co-produced by bassist Tobin Esperance's father, who included an audio recording of Tobin as a child as a bonus track on the album.

Fan club edition
In 2005, Papa Roach re-released the album exclusively to new members to their fan club, P-Roach Riot!. The fan club edition had a new cover and included a sticker and an official membership card to the fan club. The first 2,000 copies were signed by all four members of the band. The tracks "Thanx" and "Happy Birthday" are excluded from the re-release. The track "Grrbrr" is not listed on the back cover, but the song is on the CD. There is a hidden track at the end of the album, the rock demo of "Tightrope", previously only available on the EP Let 'Em Know.}

Track listing

Fan club edition

Personnel
 Jacoby Shaddix – lead vocals
 Jerry Horton – guitar, backing vocals
 Tobin Esperance – bass
 Dave Buckner – drums

References

Papa Roach albums
1997 debut albums